Castree is a surname. Notable people with the surname include:

Noel Castree (born 1968), British geographer
Ronald Castree (born 1953), English murderer